The House of Fredro (plural: Fredrowie, feminine form:  Fredrówna or  Fredrowa ) was a Polish noble family originated from Silesia or Moravia.

History
Firstly mentioned in 1407. From the 15th until the 19th century their family seat was Pleszowice near Przemyśl.

Notable members
 Aleksander Fredro
 Andrzej Maksymilian Fredro

Coat of arms
The Fredro family used the Bończa coat of arms.

Residences

References

Bibliography
 Poczet szlachty galicyjskiéj i bukowińskiéj. s. 63
 Jerzy Sewer Dunin-Borkowski (hrabia). Almanach błękitny: genealogia żyjących rodów polskich. 1908. s. 174.
 Kwartalnik historyczny, Tom 19. Towarzystwo Historyczne (Lwów, Poland), (Polska Akademia Nauk) 1905
 Witold Taszycki. Onomastica, Tomy 11-12
 Kazimierz Rymut. Nazwiska Polaków. t. I, (zob. Frydrych)